Serhat Ahmetoğlu (born 5 February 2002) is a Turkish professional footballer who plays as a winger for TFF Second League club Sarıyer.

Professional career
On 24 November 2020, Ahmetoğlu signed his first professional contract with Fenerbahçe. Ahmetoğlu made his professional debut with Fenerbahçe in a 1-0 Turkish Cup win over Kasımpaşa S.K. on 14 January 2021. On 18 January 2021, he signed on loan with Fatih Karagümrük. He debuted with Fatih Karagümrük in the Süper Lig in a 4–1 loss to Beşiktaş J.K. on 21 January 2021.

International career
Ahmetoğlu is a youth international for Turkey, having represented the Turkey U15s and U18s.

References

External links
 
 

2002 births
Living people
People from Küçükçekmece
Turkish footballers
Turkey youth international footballers
Association football wingers
Fenerbahçe S.K. footballers
Fatih Karagümrük S.K. footballers
Sarıyer S.K. footballers
Süper Lig players
TFF Second League players